The 2022 Grand Prix de France was the third event in the 2022–23 ISU Grand Prix of Figure Skating, a senior-level international invitational competition series. It was held in Angers on November 4–6. Medals were awarded in the disciplines of men's singles, women's singles, pairs, and ice dance. Skaters earned points toward qualifying for the 2022–23 Grand Prix Final.

Entries 
The International Skating Union announced the preliminary assignments on July 22, 2022.

Changes to preliminary assignments

Results

Men

Women

Pairs

Ice dance

References

2022 Grand Prix de France
2022 in figure skating
2022 in French sport
November 2022 sports events in France
Sport in Angers